The Great Book-Collectors was an 1893 book by British authors Charles Elton and Mary Augusta Elton. It deals with bibliophilia and bibliomania.

The book is generally available online rather than in original in major collections.

Connection with major collections
The book describes in detail the circumstances behind the creation of the following institutions:
 British Library
 Bodleian Library
 Ashmolean Museum

Reception
The book remains an invaluable source of information on the transition from manuscripts to books that occurred in the Middle Ages.

Copyright status
The book is in the public domain in the United States and is available online.

References

1893 non-fiction books
Book collecting